Finderne is an unincorporated community and census-designated place (CDP) located within Bridgewater Township, in Somerset County, New Jersey, United States. As of the 2010 United States Census, the CDP's population was 5,600.

Located in southeastern Bridgewater between Bound Brook and Somerville, Finderne is a diverse area with older neighborhoods bordering Foothill Road, newer developments, multi-unit housing near the Raritan River/Manville border, as well as commercial and industrial areas. The Middlebrook Crossing industrial park, the Promenade shopping center and TD Bank Ballpark, home to the Somerset Patriots, are located here.

Geography
According to the United States Census Bureau, Finderne had a total area of 4.336 square miles (11.232 km2), including 4.095 square miles (10.607 km2) of land and 0.241 square miles (0.625 km2) of water (5.56%).

Demographics

Census 2010

Points of interest

The Van Veghten House was built  and served as the headquarters of Quartermaster General Nathanael Greene during the second Middlebrook encampment (winter of 1778–79) of the American Revolutionary War. The house was added to the National Register of Historic Places in 1979, and noted as representing "one of the few remaining Raritan River mansions".

References

Bridgewater Township, New Jersey
Census-designated places in Somerset County, New Jersey